Husun As Salasil  A small village in the middle of Wadi Jabba, the land of Al Awamer, east of Yemen. It is located in the Hadhramaut Governorate.

External links
Towns and villages in the Hadhramaut Governorate

Populated places in Hadhramaut Governorate